The 68th National Film Awards ceremony was an event during which the Directorate of Film Festivals presented its annual National Film Awards to honour the best films of 2020 in Indian cinema. The awards ceremony was originally slated to be held on 3 May 2021 but was postponed due to the COVID-19 pandemic. The winners were declared on 22 July 2022, and the awards were presented on 30 September 2022.

Selection process
The Directorate of Film Festivals invited online entries and the acceptable last date for entries was until 12 March 2021. Feature and Non-Feature Films certified by Central Board of Film Certification between 1 January 2020, and 31 December 2020, were eligible for the film award categories. Books, critical studies, reviews or articles on cinema published in Indian newspapers, magazines, and journals between 1 January 2020, and 31 December 2020, were eligible for the best writing on cinema section. Entries of dubbed, revised or copied versions of a film or translation, abridgements, edited or annotated works and reprints were ineligible for the awards.

For the feature and non-feature Films sections, films in any Indian language, shot on 16 mm, 35 mm, a wider film gauge or a digital format, and released in cinemas, on video or digital formats for home viewing were eligible. Films were required to be certified as a feature film, a featurette or a Documentary/Newsreel/Non-Fiction by the Central Board of Film Certification.

Best Film Friendly State 
The awards aim at encouraging study and appreciation of cinema as an art form and dissemination of information and critical appreciation of this art-form through a State Government Policy.
Jury

Feature films

Jury

Golden Lotus Awards
Official Name: Swarna Kamal

All the awardees are awarded with 'Golden Lotus Award (Swarna Kamal)', a certificate and cash prize.

Silver Lotus Award
Official Name: Rajat Kamal

All the awardees are awarded with 'Silver Lotus Award (Rajat Kamal)', a certificate and cash prize.

Regional awards
National Film Awards are also given to the best films in the regional languages of India. Awards for the regional languages are categorised as per their mention in the Eighth schedule of the Constitution of India. Awardees included producers and directors of the film. No films in languages other than those specified in the Schedule VIII of the Constitution were eligible.

Best Feature Film in Each of the Language Other Than Those Specified In the Schedule VIII of the Constitution

Non-Feature Films
Short Films made in any Indian language and certified by the Central Board of Film Certification as a documentary/newsreel/fiction are eligible for non-feature film section.

Golden Lotus Award
Official Name: Swarna Kamal

All the awardees are awarded with 'Golden Lotus Award (Swarna Kamal)', a certificate and cash prize.

Silver Lotus Award
Official Name: Rajat Kamal

All the Awardees are awarded with 'Silver Lotus Award (Rajat Kamal)' and cash prize.

Best Writing on Cinema
The awards aim at encouraging study and appreciation of cinema as an art form and dissemination of information and critical appreciation of this art-form through publication of books, articles, reviews etc.

Jury
A committee of three, headed by Utpal Borpujari was appointed to evaluate the nominations for the best writing on Indian cinema. The jury members were as follows:

Golden Lotus Award
Official Name: Swarna Kamal

All the awardees are awarded with the Golden Lotus Award (Swarna Kamal) accompanied with a cash prize.

Special Mention (Best Book on Cinema)
All the awardees are awarded with a certificate.

References

External links
 National Film Awards Archives
 Official Page for Directorate of Film Festivals, India

2020 Indian film awards
Na
National Film Awards, 2021
National Film Awards (India) ceremonies